Eugene F. Endicott (October 14, 1848 – December 10, 1914) was a Massachusetts politician who served as the fourteenth Mayor of Chelsea, Massachusetts.]

External links
 Mayors of Chelsea 1857 – 1991

Notes

1848 births
1914 deaths
Massachusetts city council members
Mayors of Chelsea, Massachusetts
Members of the Massachusetts House of Representatives
19th-century American politicians